José Miguel Mora Porras (29 September 1816 – 15 June 1887) was interim President of Costa Rica from 15 November to 26 November 1849, when he turned over power to his older brother Juan Rafael Mora Porras.

References

Presidents of Costa Rica
1816 births
1887 deaths
19th-century Costa Rican people
Costa Rican liberals